Basel GAA is a Gaelic games club based in Basel, Switzerland.

The club was founded in 2015, and is affiliated to the Gaelic Athletic Association through Gaelic Games Europe. A youth section was launched in 2019.

The club plays hurling and camogie in the Pan-European championship and Gaelic football in the Central/East championship.

References

Gaelic games clubs in Europe